Suresh Luthra (27 November 1944 – 12 February 2019) was an Indian  first-class cricketer. He played most of his career for Delhi.

Luthra scored 1014 runs in 76 innings in first-class cricket and made one century. His left-arm fast bowling was more successful, with 262 wickets in 67 matches. His best innings figures were 9 for 70 against Services in the Ranji Trophy in 1976-77. He averaged 16.92 and amassed 14 five-wicket hauls and two ten-wicket hauls. He played some limited overs cricket before retiring in 1981.

References

External links
Suresh Luthra Cricinfo Profile

1944 births
2019 deaths
Indian cricketers
Delhi cricketers
Punjab, India cricketers
North Zone cricketers
Northern Punjab cricketers